Doylestown is the name of at least five places in the United States of America:
Doylestown, Ohio
Doylestown, Pennsylvania, a borough in Bucks County
Doylestown station, a SEPTA train station in Doylestown
Doylestown Township, Bucks County, Pennsylvania in Bucks County
Doylestown, Pennsylvania, in Franklin County
Doylestown, Wisconsin